The 1934 Oklahoma Sooners football team represented the University of Oklahoma in the 1934 college football season. In their third year under head coach Lewie Hardage, the Sooners compiled a 3–4–2 record (2–2–1 against conference opponents), finished in third place in the Big Six Conference, and outscored their opponents by a combined total of 64 to 43.

Tackle Cassius Gentry received All-America honors in 1934, and four Sooners received all-conference honors: Gentry, guard James Stacy, back Ben Poyner, and tackle Dub Wheeler.

Schedule

References

Oklahoma
Oklahoma Sooners football seasons
Oklahoma Sooners football